Lebanon is among the oldest sites of wine production in the world. The Israelite prophet Hosea (780–725 BC) is said to have urged his followers to return to God so that "they will blossom as the vine and fame be like the wine of Lebanon, [and] their fragrance will be like that of Lebanon". The Phoenicians of the coastal strip were instrumental in spreading wine and viticulture throughout the Mediterranean in ancient times. Despite the many conflicts of the region, the country has an annual production of about 8,500,000 bottles of wine.

History

 

Vitis vinifera may have been domesticated in Lebanon, although it probably arrived from the South Caucasus via Mesopotamia or the Black Sea trade routes. Vines grew readily in the land of Canaan, the coastal strip of today's Lebanon, and the wines of Byblos were exported to Egypt during the Old Kingdom (2686 BC–2134 BC). The wines of Tyre and Sidon were famous throughout the ancient Mediterranean, although not all the cargoes reached their destination; Robert Ballard of Titanic fame found the wrecks of two Phoenician ships from 750 BC, whose cargo of wine was still intact. As the first great traders of wine ('Cherem'), the Phoenicians seem to have protected it from oxidation with a layer of olive oil, followed by a seal of pinewood and resin—this may well be the origin of the Greek taste for retsina. The philosophers Zeno of Citium and Chrysippus of Soli are both said to have enjoyed their wine, in fact the latter died from overindulgence.

Wine played an important part in Phoenician religion, and the Greek/Roman god Dionysus/Bacchus may have originated in the wine rituals of Canaan. Certainly the great temple at Heliopolis (Baalbek) has many depictions of vines and winedrinking, most famously captured by David Roberts in pictures such as 'Baalbec - Ruins of the Temple of Bacchus'. Such rituals may also have influenced the Greek Bacchae, the Jewish Passover Seder feast and the Christian Eucharist.  The Bacchus temple in Baalbek outlines the instrumental role that the Phoenician played in the development of the Ancient World around the Mediterranean sea. through the widespread peaceful settlements that reached Spain. Genesis 14:18 mentions that the Phoenician King Melchizedek gave bread and wine (yayin) to Abraham, and Hosea 14:8 suggests "his fame shall be like the wine of Lebanon". Wine also featured heavily in Ugaritic poetry such as the Rapiuma :
"Day long they pour the wine, ... must-wine, fit for rulers. Wine, sweet and abundant, Select wine... The choice wine of Lebanon, Most nurtured by El."

Once Lebanon became part of the Caliphate, wine production declined, although under the millet system it was tolerated among the Christian population for religious purposes. The Christians also developed Arak, an ouzo-like spirit flavored with aniseed.

The first winemaker in Lebanon was Chateau Joseph Spath (Chateau Chbat) in 1847 at aaramoun kesrouan, later following of winemaker at Château Ksara in 1857 when Jesuits planted Cinsaut vines from Algeria at Château Ksara near Zahlé in the central Beqaa Valley. In 1868 a French engineer, Eugène François Brun, set up Domaine des Tourelles, and others followed, notably Gaston Hochar's Chateau Musar in 1930.

The French influence between the World Wars promoted a culture of wine drinking, as did the sophisticated Mediterranean culture of Beirut at that time.

Frenchman Yves Morard of Chateau Kefraya was arrested as a spy during the Israeli invasion, and was only released when he proved to the Israelis that he knew how to make wine.

The end of the conflict in the 1990s brought a new momentum to the viticulture and we could track the renaissance of the Lebanese wines to the set up of Domaine Wardy in 1997 and Massaya in 1998  that marked the active involvement of French wine dynasties in the Bekaa Valley. Back then, the number of producers was around 5 and at present more than 50 wineries are active in Lebanon.

The 2006 conflict, did not really change the trend even if some wineries were on the edge of missing the harvest (Ksara) and got collateral damages (Massaya). However, the media coverage translated into surge in demand during the fighting as British buyers in particular bought Lebanese wine as a mark of solidarity.

Grape varieties

Lebanese winemakers have favored French grapes, particularly Cabernet Sauvignon, Merlot and Rhone varietals such as Cinsault, Carignan and Grenache.

There are also grapes that are specific and indigenous to Lebanon such as Obaideh and Merwah.

Wineries
 
Most of the major wineries have their vineyards in the southern Beqaa Valley. Château Ksara remains much the biggest, with 70% of all the country's production. It is no longer connected with the Jesuit house of Tanail, it was sold in 1972 and suffered considerably during the civil war, but has now bounced back with reds and rosés made from Rhone varietals such as Carignan and Cinsaut.

Next biggest is Château Kefraya, whose majority of shares were bought by Druze politician Walid Jumblat from the De Bustros family in the late 1980s. 

Cave Kouroum is a winery located in Kefraiya. Founded by Mr Bassim Rahhal in 1998.  Cave Kouroum has an area of 7500 meters squared. Produces red, white, and rose wine. 

Chateau Musar is perhaps the best known in the West, it was a particular favourite of Auberon Waugh. Musar achieved international recognition at the Bristol Wine Fair of 1979  and for a long time was the only Lebanese wine widely available in the United Kingdom. The second wine, 'Hochar', is made in a lighter style for earlier drinking. Chateau Musar is known for transporting the grapes across the front line during the civil war. In recent years many smaller wineries have come up in different areas cross Lebanon, some of these include Domaine Wardy in the Beqaa and Karam Wines in Jezzine, South of Lebanon.

Currently the sector exports over 50% of the production mainly to the United Kingdom, France and the United States.

List of Lebanese wines

References
 Karam, Michael (2005) "The Wines of Lebanon" Saqi Books - reference book on Lebanese wine

Jean-Pierre BEL, Les paysages viticoles de la Bekaa (Liban), Paris : BoD, 2009, 232 p

Jean-Pierre BEL, Vignes et vins au Liban : 4 000 ans de succès, Paris : BoD, 2014, 416 p

External links
lebwine.com Wine of Lebanon
Map of Lebanese wineries from Chateau Kefraya
On Lebanese Wines by David Furer